The Chevrolet Tracker is a subcompact crossover SUV manufactured by General Motors since 2019. Positioned as a successor to the Trax (also called the Tracker in several markets), it is produced in Brazil and Argentina for the Latin American market, and in China by SAIC-GM for the Chinese market. Despite the use of the Tracker name, the Tracker is not related to the model sold in North America as a rebadged Suzuki Escudo from the 1990s to the 2000s.

Overview 
The Tracker in the Chinese market was revealed in 2019 alongside the Trailblazer. The Chinese-market Tracker was designed to replace the Trax in China, and shares its Chinese name as the Trax. The Global Emerging Markets (GEM) platform which the Chinese market Tracker was built on was designed for developing automotive markets including China and Latin America.

Markets

China 
The Chinese market Tracker is available with a 3-cylinder 1.0-litre turbo engine producing  and a 3-cylinder 1.3-litre turbo engine producing .

Brazil 
The Tracker made its Brazilian debut in 2020, with production commencing at the São Caetano do Sul assembly.

Mexico 
GM announced that the Tracker would arrive in Mexico to replace the first generation Trax.

Philippines 
The Tracker was unveiled in the Philippine market in July 2021 and is imported from China.

Argentina 
In April 2022, the Tracker began to be produced in Argentina by General Motors de Argentina at the General Alvear factory in Santa Fe Province. 300 million USD were invested to upgrade the plant, which will see its annual capacity increase from 80,000 to 115,000 vehicles. It is the only B-segment SUV made in Argentina. 80% of its production is exported. The 1.2-litre engine is imported from the Joinville factory in Brazil.

Uzbekistan 
The Tracker is also produced in Uzbekistan by UzAuto Motors at the Asaka plant since July 2022, replacing the China-imported model. The model is offered with the 1.2-litre turbocharged engine and marketed as the "Tracker 2" to avoid confusion with the previous Trax-based model, which was earlier offered in the region under the same title. Unlike Latin American production, the engines for the Tracker are built locally at UzAuto Motors Powertrain, sister company to UzAuto Motors. 

The production is planned to reach annual capacity of 70,000 units and is part of the two stage progression of GEM platform integration in Uzbekistan. The second stage will start in the first quarter of 2023 with the production of Chevrolet Onix. The overall costs of the GEM production lines are estimated at over 600 million USD for UzAuto Motors.

Safety 
The Chevrolet Tracker is equipped with six airbags and electronic stability control as standard.

During some of Latin NCAP's crash tests on the Tracker, its pyrotechnic seatbelt pretensioners ignited insulation material at the base of the B-pillar, starting a fire and prompting a recall by Chevrolet. Additionally, the seatbelt buckles failed to release normally after the crash. Latin NCAP announced that the results published for the Tracker would be for the car with the recall implemented.

References

External links 

 Traceker (China) 
 Tracker (Argentina) 

Tracker (2019)
Cars introduced in 2019
2020s cars
Mini sport utility vehicles
Crossover sport utility vehicles
Front-wheel-drive vehicles
All-wheel-drive vehicles